Denis Daly (6 November 1876 – 2 March 1947) was an Irish hurler who played for Cork Championship club Shanballymore. He played for the Cork senior hurling team for one season during which time he usually lined out at midfield.

Playing career

Shanballymore

Daly joined the Shanballymore club at an early age and eventually became one of the stalwarts of the club. On 3 May 1903, he captained the Shanballymore senior team that were defeated by Dungourney in the delayed 1902 Cork Championship final.

Cork

Daly made his first appearance for the Cork senior hurling team on 31 August 1902 in a 3-12 to 1-04 defeat of Kerry. On 26 April 1903, he won a Munster Championship medal following a 3-10 to 2-06 defeat of Clare in the final. Daly was at centre-field when Cork suffered a 1-05 to 0-04 defeat by London in the delayed 1901 All-Ireland final on 2 August 1903.

Honours

Cork
Munster Senior Hurling Championship (1): 1901

References

1876 births
1947 deaths
Shanballymore hurlers
Cork inter-county hurlers